Enola is a census-designated place (CDP) located along the Susquehanna River in East Pennsboro Township, Cumberland County, Pennsylvania, United States. The population was 6,111 at the 2010 census. Norfolk Southern operates Enola Yard, a large rail yard and locomotive shop in Enola. It is situated in Cumberland County, directly across the Susquehanna River from Harrisburg and is part of the Harrisburg–Carlisle metropolitan statistical area.

History
The town came into existence due to the building of rail lines through the area. Local farmers Francis and Wesley Miller sold 
 to the Pennsylvania Railroad to be used as a flag station. Mr. Miller was given the honor of naming the train station. He named the station "Enola", after his daughter. Miller at the time was the only resident living in the area. Eventually, when more people moved to the area the local post office and surrounding town adopted the name as well.

In the fall of 1902, the Pennsylvania Railroad made the decision to build a classification yard  "between Marysville, Pennsylvania and West Fairview, Pennsylvania, Enola Yard." In 1903, their agent, the Manor Realty Co. purchasing , officially opened the yards in January 1905. Of the 743 acres, the Enola Realty Co. bought  for $26,500. This would officially become known as Enola (or current North Enola).

Starting in 1909, the Realty Company went on to build more than 220 homes which it rented or sold to families coming to the village looking for employment.

South Enola grew almost as rapidly as North Enola. Some of the landowners were Mann, Bretz, Darr, Ruplay, Pyne, and Addams.

West Enola also grew with the boom of the Enola Yards. The largest landowner of that time was Britton. Other large landowners were Lantz and Renninger.

Enola is served by a single high school, East Pennsboro High School. Originally named Enola High School, it was built on farmland which had been owned by the Gutshall family from the late 1800s until the 1940s. It is located at 425 West Shady Lane, parallel to Gutshall Road. The original Enola High School is located on 98 South Enola Drive. It is the home of the East Pennsboro Branch Library. An early elementary school is located at 126 N. Enola Drive. That property was sold and now houses several businesses.

Geography

It is on the west shore of the Susquehanna River facing the city of Harrisburg. U.S. Route 11/15 runs north-to-south through Enola.

Demographics

Education
East Pennsboro Area School District serves as the public education center for Enola. The district consists of four schools: East Pennsboro Area High School, East Pennsboro Area Middle School, East Pennsboro Elementary School, and West Creek Hills Elementary School with a total enrollment of about 2,900 students.

Notable people
 Billy Myers, infielder, drove in Game 7-winning run of 1940 World Series
 Lynn Myers, Major League Baseball player, brother of Billy Myers
 Betty Warfel, pitcher and infielder, played for Rockford Peaches
 George W. Fisher, first Yard Master of the newly built Enola Yard, then the largest freight yard in the world. He was an employee of the Pennsylvania Railroad when he, his wife, and eight children moved from Philadelphia to Enola in 1906 for him to assume his new position.

References

Census-designated places in Cumberland County, Pennsylvania
Census-designated places in Pennsylvania
Harrisburg–Carlisle metropolitan statistical area